Diala albugo is a species of sea snail, a marine gastropod mollusk in the family Dialidae.

Description
The shell size varies between 2 mm and 6.5 mm

Distribution
This species is distributed in the Indian Ocean along Réunion and in the Pacific Ocean along the Philippines.

References

 Dautzenberg, Ph. (1929). Mollusques testacés marins de Madagascar. Faune des Colonies Francaises, Tome III

External links
 

Dialidae
Gastropods described in 1886